A barrel shroud is an external covering that envelops (either partially or full-length) the barrel of a firearm, to prevent unwanted direct contact with the barrel (e.g. accidental collision with surrounding objects, or the user accidentally touching a hot barrel, which can lead to burns).  Moving coverings such as pistol slides, fore-end extension of the gunstock/chassis that do not fully encircle the barrel, and the receiver (or frame) of a firearm itself are generally not described as barrel shrouds, though they can functionally act as such.

In shotguns, a thin, slim partial shroud known as a rib is often mounted above barrel to shield away the mirage generated by barrel heat, which can interfere with aiming.

Full-length barrel shrouds are commonly featured on air-cooled machine guns, where frequent rapid bursts or sustained automatic fire will leave the barrel extremely hot and dangerous to the user.  However, shrouds can also be utilized on semi-automatic firearms, especially the ones with light-weight barrels, as even a small number of shots can heat up a barrel enough to injure the user in certain circumstances.

Barrel shrouds are also used on pump-action shotguns.  The military trench shotgun features a ventilated metal handguard with a bayonet attachment lug. Ventilated handguards or heat shields (usually without bayonet lugs) are also used on police riot shotguns and shotguns marketed for civilian self-defense. The heat shield also serves as an attachment base for accessories such as sights or sling swivels.

Handguard

A handguard (also known as the forend or forearm) on firearms is a barrel shroud specifically designed to allow the user to grip the front of the gun.  It provides a safe heat-insulated surface for the user's hand to firmly hold onto without needing to worry about getting burned by the barrel, which may become very hot when firing.  It can also serve as an attachment platform for secondary weapons (such as an underslung M203 grenade launcher or M26-MASS) as well as accessories such as bipods, tactical lights, laser sights, night-vision devices, foregrips (or handstops), slings and a variety of other attachments.

Handguards are typically available as two types. The first has a contact point at the base of the barrel and a predetermined length up the barrel. They are typically made of polymer if they are this brand but can be made of different types of alloys. If they have the two contact points they are considered to be a drop in handguard. The other type attaches around the barrel but does not make contact with it directly. That particular type of handguard is, the majority of the time, made out of some form of aluminum or aluminum alloy. That allows for what is considered a free-floating barrel. Free floating barrels are known to have greater accuracy than their counterparts that have drop in hand guards.
They also use a number of mounting systems with the main ones being M-LOK, KeyMod, and Picatinny.

When talking about melee weapons, a "handguard" refers to the crossguard (also known as the quillons or crosstree), the enlarged front part of a sword, saber or knife/dagger's hilt, which protects the wielder's hands from an opponent's blade sliding towards the hilt, or prevents the wielder's own hand and fingers from accidentally slipping onto the blade when stabbing.

Free-floating Handguard

Free-floating handguards, also referred to as "floating" handguards, have seen a rise in popularity in the recent years. They work by only attaching to the firearm at one point (on the barrel nut by the upper receiver) while the remainder of the handguard does not make contact with the barrel. This gives the impression that the handguard is "floating" around the barrel, hence the name.

Free-floating handguards have been known to increase accuracy between 0.5 and 0.75 MOA (0.15-0.2 mrad) compared to their drop-in counterparts. The reason for this increase in accuracy is due to the avoidance of an issue known as barrel warping.

Barrel warping occurs when the handguard makes contact with the barrel which then slightly alters the barrel's angle reducing accuracy. An instance where this would occur would be when a rifle is propped up against a surface during or when a bipod is used. Force exerted onto the handguard pushes back up against the barrel which in turn changes the barrel's angle reducing accuracy. The angle may seem insignificant, however, even a slight deviation can be magnified causing the shot to be widely off down range.

Free float handguards do not suffer from barrel warping due to the fact that the handguard floats around but does not make contact with the barrel. Force exerted onto the handguard is not pushed back onto the barrel which allows for an increase in accuracy.

See also
M-LOK - free licensed competing standard to KeyMod
KeyMod - open sourced competing standard to M-Lok
Muzzle shroud

References

External links
Finned carbine handguard assembly  Randy E. Luth (patent)
KeyMod vs. M-LOK Modular Rail System Comparison, Presented by Caleb McGee, Naval Special Warfare Center Crane Division, 4 May 2017

Firearm components